This is a summary of 1913 in music in the United Kingdom.

Events
10 September – The première of Jean Sibelius's tone poem Luonnotar takes place at the Three Choirs Festival in Gloucester Cathedral, with soprano Aino Ackté and orchestra conducted by Herbert Brewer.
1 October – Marie Lloyd and her lover, Bernard Dillon, are arrested by the US immigration authorities on their arrival in New York, when it is discovered that they are not married.
date unknown
Edward Bairstow becomes organist of York Minster.
Ivor Novello moves into a flat above the Strand Theatre in London's West End; in 2005, the theatre would be renamed in his honour.

Popular music
Albert Ketèlbey – "My Heart Still Clings to You" 
Arnold Safroni-Middleton – "Imperial Echoes"

Recordings
Harry Lauder – "It's Nicer To Be In Bed"

Classical music: new works
Arnold Bax – Three Pieces for Small Orchestra 
York Bowen – At the Play
George Butterworth – The Banks of Green Willow
Edward Elgar – Falstaff
Gustav Holst – St Paul's Suite
John Ireland
Decorations
The Forgotten Rite
The Holy Boy
Ralph Vaughan Williams – Fantasia on a Theme by Thomas Tallis (revised version)

Musical theatre
7 February – After the Girl, with music by Paul Rubens and lyrics by Percy Greenbank, opens at the Gaiety Theatre for a run of 105 performances.
18 February – Oh! Oh! Delphine!, with music by Ivan Caryll and lyrics by C.M.S. McLellan, opens at the Shaftesbury Theatre for a run of 174 performances.
25 September – The Pearl Girl, with music by Howard Talbot & Hugo Felix and lyrics by Basil Hood, opens at the Shaftesbury Theatre, starring Marjorie Maxwell, for a run of 254 performances.

Publications
Francesco Berger – Reminiscences, Impressions, and Anecdotes.
Frank Bridge – Second Book of Organ Pieces

Births
27 January – Jack Brymer, clarinettist (died 2003)
28 February – Wally Ridley, record producer and songwriter (died 2007)
13 March – Tessie O'Shea, entertainer (died 1995)
2 April – Ronald Center, composer (died 1973)
28 June – George Lloyd, composer (died 1998)
28 August – Robert Irving, conductor (died 1991)
22 November – Benjamin Britten, composer (died 1976)

Deaths
19 March – John Thomas, harpist and composer, 87
5 May – Helen Carte (Helen Lenoir; née Black), impresario, 60
17 July – Armes Beaumont, singer best known in Australia, 70
26 August – Michael Maybrick, singer and composer, 72
13 September – Alfred Gaul, composer, conductor and organist, 76
20 October – Charles Brookfield, musical theatre writer, 56 (tuberculosis)
6 December – Alexander Hurley, music hall performer, 42 (pneumonia)

See also
 1913 in the United Kingdom

References

British Music, 1913 in
Music
British music by year
1910s in British music